Husbands and Wives is a 1992 American comedy-drama film written and directed by Woody Allen. The film stars Allen, Mia Farrow, Sydney Pollack, Judy Davis, Lysette Anthony, Juliette Lewis, Liam Neeson and Blythe Danner. The film debuted shortly after the end of Allen and Farrow's romantic and professional partnership, and was the last of their 13 films together. The movie is filmed by Carlo Di Palma with a handheld camera style and features documentary-like interviews with the characters interspersed with the story.

Husbands and Wives, released by TriStar Pictures, was Allen's first film as sole director for a studio other than United Artists or Orion Pictures (both now part of Metro-Goldwyn-Mayer) since Take the Money and Run (1969). It received critical acclaim despite being a box-office failure, and was nominated for two Academy Awards, Best Supporting Actress (Judy Davis) and Best Original Screenplay (Woody Allen).

Plot
The film follows two couples, Jack and Sally, and Gabe and Judy. It starts with Jack and Sally visiting Gabe and Judy's apartment to announce their separation. Gabe is shocked, but Judy takes it personally and is deeply hurt. The four of them go out for dinner at a Chinese restaurant, still confused about the situation.

A few weeks later, Sally visits a colleague's apartment to plan an evening at the opera and dinner. She calls Jack from the colleague's phone and accuses him of having an affair during their marriage after learning that he has met someone new.

Judy and Gabe meet Jack's new girlfriend, Sam, who is an aerobics trainer. While Judy and Sam go shopping, Gabe calls Sam a "cocktail waitress" and tells Jack that he's crazy for leaving Sally for her. Later, Judy introduces Michael, her colleague from the magazine, to Sally. They begin dating, but Sally is unsatisfied with the relationship.

Meanwhile, Gabe has developed a friendship with Rain, a young student, who reads and criticizes his novel manuscript. They share a romantic moment at her 21st birthday party, but Gabe decides they should not pursue it any further.

At a party, Jack learns that Sally is seeing someone else and becomes jealous. He and Sam argue intensely, and Jack drives home to find Sally in bed with Michael. He asks Sally to give their marriage another chance, but she refuses.

Less than two weeks later, Jack and Sally are back together and meet Gabe and Judy for dinner. Afterward, Judy and Gabe argue about her not sharing her poetry, and Gabe makes a failed pass at her. Judy tells him she thinks the relationship is over, and a week later Gabe moves out. Judy begins seeing Michael.

In the end, Jack and Sally are still struggling with their marital problems, but they accept them as the price they have to pay to remain together. Gabe is living alone and not dating to avoid hurting anyone, including himself. The film ends with Gabe asking the unseen documentary crew if he can leave and if the film is over.

Cast
The cast includes (in credits order):

 Woody Allen as Gabe Roth
 Mia Farrow as Judy Roth
 Judy Davis as Sally Simmons
 Sydney Pollack as Jack Simmons
 Juliette Lewis as Rain
 Liam Neeson as Michael Gates
 Lysette Anthony as Sam
 Cristi Conaway as Shawn Grainger, call girl
 Timothy Jerome as Paul, Sally's date
 Ron Rifkin as Richard, Rain's analyst
 Bruce Jay Friedman as Peter Styles
 Jeffrey Kurland as interviewer-narrator (voice)
 Benno Schmidt as Judy's ex-husband
 Nick Metropolis as TV scientist
 Rebecca Glenn as Gail
 Galaxy Craze as Harriet
 John Doumanian as Hamptons' party guest
 Gordon Rigsby as Hamptons' party guest
 Ilene Blackman as Receptionist
 Blythe Danner as Rain's mother
 Brian McConnachie	as Rain's father
 Ron August as Rain's ex lover
 John Bucher as Rain's ex lover
 Matthew Flint as Carl, Rain's Boyfriend

Soundtrack

"What Is This Thing Called Love" (1929) by Cole Porter, performed by Leo Reisman and His Orchestra
"West Coast Blues" (1960), written and performed by Wes Montgomery
Symphony No. 9 in D, I. Andante Commodo (1909–10) by Gustav Mahler, performed by John Barbirolli and the Berlin Philharmonic
"That Old Feeling" (1937) by Lew Brown (lyrics) and Sammy Fain (music), performed by Stan Getz and Gerry Mulligan
"Top Hat, White Tie and Tails" (1935) by Irving Berlin, performed by Bernie Leighton
"Makin' Whoopee" (1928), by Walter Donaldson (music) and Gus Kahn (lyrics), performed by Bernie Leighton
"The Song Is You" (1932), by Jerome Kern (music) and Oscar Hammerstein II (lyrics), performed by Bernie Leighton

Reception

Box office
Husbands and Wives opened on September 18, 1992 in 865 theatres, where it earned $3,520,550 ($4,070 per screen) in its opening weekend. It went on to gross $10.5 million in North America during its theatrical run. The film was also screened at the 1992 Toronto Festival of Festivals.

Critical response
Husbands and Wives opened to acclaim from film critics. The review aggregator Rotten Tomatoes reports that 93% of critics have given the film a positive review based on 40 reviews, with an average score of 8.2/10.

Peter Travers of Rolling Stone called it "a defining film for these emotionally embattled times; it's classic Woody Allen."  Todd McCarthy of Variety similarly praised the film as "a full meal, as it deals with the things of life with intelligence, truthful drama and rueful humor."

Vincent Canby of The New York Times called it "a very fine, sometimes brutal comedy about a small group of contemporary New Yorkers, each an edgy, self-analyzing achiever who goes through life without much joy, but who finds a certain number of cracked satisfactions along the way."  He added, "'Husbands and Wives' -- the entire Allen canon, for that matter -- represents a kind of personal cinema for which there is no precedent in modern American movies. Even our best directors are herd animals. Mr. Allen is a rogue: he travels alone." Roger Ebert of the Chicago Sun-Times opined, "... what 'Husbands and Wives' argues is that many 'rational' relationships are actually not as durable as they seem, because somewhere inside every person is a child crying me! me! me! We say we want the other person to be happy. What we mean is, we want them to be happy with us, just as we are, on our terms."

In 2016, Time Out contributors ranked Husbands and Wives fifth among Allen's efforts, with Keith Uhlich praising the work's "trenchant examination of long-term relationships on the downswing". The same year, Robbie Collin and Tim Robey of The Daily Telegraph listed Husbands and Wives as his seventh greatest film, calling it "a rapid marvel of four-way characterization" and praising the opening scene as "one of Allen’s most vividly written, shot and acted scenes ever".

Accolades

References

External links
 
 
 
 

1992 films
1990s romantic comedy-drama films
1990s mockumentary films
American mockumentary films
American romantic comedy-drama films
American satirical films
Best Foreign Film Guldbagge Award winners
Films about marriage
Films directed by Woody Allen
Films produced by Robert Greenhut
Films set in New York City
Films shot in New York City
Films whose writer won the Best Original Screenplay BAFTA Award
Films with screenplays by Woody Allen
TriStar Pictures films
1992 comedy films
1992 drama films
1990s English-language films
1990s American films